Scott Jenkins may also refer to:

 Scott K. Jenkins, American politician
 Scott Jenkins (soccer) (born 1973), American soccer player
 Scott Jenkins (runner) (born 1980), Welsh ultrarunner